Marali Goodige  is a 1984 Indian Kannada film directed by K. R. Shantharam. It stars Kalyan Kumar, Jai Jagadeesh,  Roopa and Poornima in the lead roles. The music of the film was composed by Rajan–Nagendra. This movie is based on the novel by Smt. Aryamba Pattabhi, with the same name.

Cast
 Kalyan Kumar
 Jai Jagadeesh
 Roopa
 Poornima

Songs
 "Hosa Baalina Hosa Bandhana"
 "Nee Nudiyadiralenu"
 "Varavaagi Bandeya"
 "Yaaru Nannavanenedu"

References

1984 films
1980s Kannada-language films